is a 2009 J-horror, "found footage" film in the form of a documentary. The movie was written and directed by Kōji Shiraishi.

Plot
In 2005, a man named Ken Matsuki kills two people and injures a third in a mass stabbing at a Japanese resort called Myogasaki. Following the act, Matsuki jumps off a nearby cliff and his body is never found. Three years later, a documentary film crew led by Koji Shiraishi begin a project chronicling the aftermath of the incident and interview several survivors. One of them is the injured victim, Shohei Eno, an unemployed man who had a strange petroglyph-like symbol carved into his back by Matsuki. To the crew's surprise, Eno states that he doesn't blame Matsuki for the stabbing; rather, he says he is thankful, as, in the aftermath, he has begun experiencing "miracles," including UFO sightings, hearing voices, and witnessing telekinetic phenomenon. Eno further tells the crew that as he was being stabbed, Matsuki told him "it is your turn," which Eno takes as an imperative to perform a "ceremony" mandated by God, which he believes was the motive behind the mass stabbing. Seeing that Eno is financially troubled, the crew agree to let him live in their offices and pay him on the condition that they are allowed to film the occurrences.

Shiraishi's crew come to be repulsed by Eno, especially since they think that he will follow Matsuki's path of mass murder. From Matsuki's father, the crew learns that Eno's symbol resembles the birthmark possessed by Matsuki since childhood. Their search brings them to Kutoro Rock (九頭呂岩, literally "Nine-Headed Spine Rock"), a formation at the peak of Mount Ohiruyama, where Shiraishi had a bizarre experience the same day as the mass stabbing, in which he found nine leeches biting his left leg. At Kutoro, the crew find a stone with Matsuki and Eno's petrogylph symbols inscribed on it. According to horror film director Kiyoshi Kurosawa, Kutoro Rock was dedicated to Hiruko, a Japanese god with the form of leech. Meanwhile, the film Eno shoots following his daily routine reveals the "UFOs" are, in fact, leech-like apparitions that appear in the skies above Tokyo.

Shiraishi takes Eno to a Korean barbecue restaurant to get him to talk openly about what the voices tell him to do. Drunk and relaxed, Eno reveals that he has been saving ¥700,000 to build a bomb so he can commit a suicide bombing in a busy street in Shibuya, which he claims will send him and his victims to Hiruko's realm, a place he likens to paradise. Shiraishi resolves to stop Eno, but on the way home, he sees Eno's head surrounded by the leech-like apparitions and finds his leg bleeding as it did when the leaches bit it. Shiraishi reluctantly agrees to cooperate, intending to record Eno's plot for posterity. After spending a day with Eno prior to the bombing, Eno offers him a ¥100 coin to repay one he borrowed near the beginning of their relationship. Shiraishi instead asks him to keep it and return it and the camera from the realm he expects to go to as proof his plan succeeded. The blast ends up claiming 108 lives, including Shinobu Kuribayashi, a member of Shiraishi's film crew. Eno's body, like Matsuki, is never found. Shiraishi, meanwhile, is sentenced to prison for complicity.

21 years later, Shiraishi is released from prison and reunites with his producer. They return to the Korean barbecue, where Eno's camera and the ¥100 coin fall from the ceiling. The footage inside the camera shows Eno and the others killed in the blast being tormented by leech and jellyfish-like creatures in a nightmarish, Lovecraftian realm which Eno screams is Hell.

See also

The Curse (2005), another "found footage" mockumentary by the same director
Shirome (2010), another "found footage" mockumentary by the same director
Chō Akunin (2011), another "found footage" film by the same director

References

External links

2009 horror films
2009 films
Found footage films
Japanese horror films
2000s mockumentary films
Films directed by Kōji Shiraishi
Japanese psychological horror films
Japanese supernatural horror films
2000s Japanese films